WFTL (850 AM) is a news/talk radio station licensed to West Palm Beach, Florida with studios located in West Palm Beach. The station operates with 50,000 watts daytime power and 20,000 watts nighttime power, providing coverage of Palm Beach, Broward, and part of Miami-Dade Counties. The station is currently owned by Hubbard Broadcasting, through licensee WPP FCC License Sub, LLC.

The station is the South Florida home of Florida State Seminoles football.

850 AM is a United States clear-channel frequency.

History
The station launched as WEAT on February 14, 1948. Licensed to Lake Worth Broadcasting Corporation, the station broadcast on 1490 kc. with 100 watts of power. In 1954 WEAT changed its community of license to West Palm Beach and moved to 850 kc. at 1,000 watts of power.

Ownership
For many years prior to October 1, 1982, WEAT was owned by billionaire John D. MacArthur and was paired with WEAT-FM (Easy 104.3).  In October 1986 sportscaster Curt Gowdy sold the station to J.J. Taylor Companies Inc. of North Dartmouth, Mass., for an undisclosed price.  In October 1995, it was sold with WEAT-FM to OmniAmerica Group of Cleveland for an estimated $18 million.

In May 1996, WEAT was sold with seven other stations for $178 million to Chancellor Broadcasting Co., and WEAT was sold again in June of that year, along with WEAT-FM 104.3 and WOLL 94.3 to American Radio Systems of Boston.

In April 1998, the station was sold to James Hilliard's James Crystal Enterprises for $1.5 million and changed its call letters to WDJA. (Dow Jones Averages) becoming a business talk station.

WFTL, along with co-owned stations KBXD, WFLL, and WMEN, was purchased out of bankruptcy from James Crystal Enterprises by Mark Jorgenson's ACM JCE IV B LLC in a transaction that was consummated on August 6, 2015, at a purchase price of $5.5 million. The station was operated by Palm Beach Broadcasting until that company was acquired by Alpha Media in February 2016. Alpha announced its intent to purchase the station outright in February 2017; Alpha's purchase of WFTL and WMEN, at a price of $2 million, was consummated on April 27, 2017.

On September 27, 2018, Alpha Media agreed to sell their cluster at West Palm Beach to Hubbard Radio. The sale, at a price of $88 million, was consummated on January 23, 2019.

Timeline
1948 – originally an NBC affiliate, airing everything from NBC Theater to Eddie Cantor.

prior to October 1, 1982 – format was country music.

October 1, 1982 – became news/talk radio

April 16, 1984 – became adult contemporary WCGY, 1960s' and 1970s' music with 25% current music.

prior to April 1985 – station was once again known as WEAT and simulcasting WEAT-FM's Easy 104 format.

March 1992 – WEAT-FM switches to adult contemporary. According to the Sun-Sentinel, on the AM side, WEAT (AM 850) has adopted a more conservative easy listening format to keep the station's 45-and-older listeners. The studios have been re-equipped for digital sound, with all the music on compact disc and all the commercials run from a computer hard drive.

July 1994 – switches to all-news format

November 2000 – Jack Cole, formerly of WJNO, begins a daily hour-long show.

October 2001 – Jack Cole leaves the air because of a brain tumor.  He died three months later.

October 2003 – becomes "Live 85" with call letters WFTL, swapping with a Ft. Lauderdale station at 1400. Live 85 was an all-news format.

August 2005 – becomes NewsTalk 8-5-oh WFTL after a failed all news format. New slogan adopted as "Bigger, Better, Smarter"

References

External links
 850 WFTL official website
 The Rich Stevens Show - Official website

WFTL Radio -- "Live 85" 850 kHz AM (formerly 1400)

FTL
News and talk radio stations in the United States
1948 establishments in Florida
Radio stations established in 1948
Hubbard Broadcasting